Mount Mumpu is the tallest free-standing mountain in Zambia at nearly . It is regularly used by Chengelo Secondary School for expeditions run by the Ndubaluba Outdoor Centre. The Western ascent has a route through one of the largest bat caves in southern Africa.

External links 
 Chengelo School
 Ndualuba Outdoor Centre

Mountains of Zambia